Room at the Bottom may refer to:
 Room at the Bottom (Dad's Army), an episode of the British comedy series Dad's Army
 Room at the Bottom (1967 TV series), a British comedy television series
 Room at the Bottom (1986 TV series), a British comedy television series

See also
 There's Plenty of Room at the Bottom, a lecture given by physicist Richard Feynman